Dönmez is a Turkish surname, it may refer to:

Karsu Dönmez (born 1990), Amsterdam-born singer, pianist and composer 
Şebnem Dönmez (born 1974), Turkish actress in movies and television series

See also
Don Metz (disambiguation)

Turkish-language surnames